Jos riots can refer to:

 2001 Jos riots
 2008 Jos riots
 2010 Jos riots